The women's artistic gymnastics floor final at the 2019 European Games was held at the Minsk Arena on June 30.

Qualification 

Qualification took place on June 27. Denisa Golgotă from Romania qualified in first, followed by Ukraine's Anastasia Bachynska and Jessica Castles of Sweden.

The reserves were:

Medalists

Results 
Oldest and youngest competitors

References

Gymnastics at the 2019 European Games